Grey Bees is a novel by Ukrainian author Andrey Kurkov. Originally published in 2018 in Kurkov’s native Russian, it was translated by Boris Dralyuk and published in English in 2020 (by MacLehose Press, UK) and 2022 (by Deep Vellum, USA).

This novel has "elements of both the fable and the epic", and it dramatises the conflict in Ukraine through the adventures of a beekeeper.

References

External links 
 PBS NewsHour interview with Andrey Kurkov (April 11, 2022)

Novels by Andrey Kurkov
2018 novels
Fiction about beekeeping
Russian-Ukrainian culture
Russian-language novels